This is a summary of the electoral history of Jeremy Corbyn, Leader of the Opposition and Leader of the Labour Party of the United Kingdom from 2015 to 2020 and Member of Parliament for Islington North since 1983.

Council elections

1974 Haringey Borough Council election, South Hornsey

1978 Haringey Borough Council election, Haringay

1982 Haringey Borough Council election, Haringay

Parliamentary elections

1983 general election, Islington North

1987 general election, Islington North

1992 general election, Islington North

1997 general election, Islington North

2001 general election, Islington North

2005 general election, Islington North

2010 general election, Islington North

2015 general election, Islington North

2017 general election, Islington North

2019 general election, Islington North

Labour Party leadership election, 2015
Following the resignation of Ed Miliband as Labour Party leader on 8 May 2015, Jeremy Corbyn announced his candidacy for the position on 3 June 2015. The new leader would be decided by a ballot of party members, supporters and affiliates, where the candidate securing over 50% would be elected.

First preference votes, result announced 12 September 2015

Labour Party leadership election, 2016

The British Labour Party leadership election of 2016 was called when a challenge to Jeremy Corbyn as Leader of the Labour Party arose following criticism of his allegedly weak support for the Remain campaign in the referendum on membership of the European Union and questions about his leadership of the party.

First preference votes, result announced 24 September 2016

2017 United Kingdom general election

2019 United Kingdom general election

References

Jeremy Corbyn
Corbyn, Jeremy
Corbyn, Jeremy